El Cuchillo is a village in Tinajo, Las Palmas province of western Lanzarote in the Canary Islands

Populated places in Lanzarote